Cossus inconspicuus is a moth in the family Cossidae first described by Herbert Druce in 1910. It is found in Colombia.

References

Cossus
Moths of South America
Moths described in 1910